Pyramidelloides angustus is a species of sea snail, a marine gastropod mollusk in the family Eulimidae. The species is one of a number within the genus Pyramidelloides.

References

 Warén A. (1983) An anatomical description of Eulima bilineata Alder with remarks on and a revision of Pyramidelloides Nevill (Mollusca, Prosobranchia, Eulimidae). Zoologica Scripta 12(4): 273-294
 Severns M. (2011) Shells of the Hawaiian Islands - The Sea Shells. Conchbooks, Hackenheim. 564 pp

External links
 To World Register of Marine Species

Eulimidae
Gastropods described in 1898